Radarsoft is a Dutch software development company that published video games in the 1980s. It released its first game (3D Tic Tac Toe) in 1984 for the Commodore 64. Until 1987 Radarsoft released multiple titles for the Amiga, Atari, Philips MSX and DOS. Their main focus was the Dutch market, so most games are only available in Dutch. In 1986 Radarsoft went to the American video game market, but a packaging error at a Dutch warehouse cost the studio more money than they were able to recoup.

The software company was created after John Vanderaart, Cees Kramer and Edwin Neuteboom, who had already made several games together, met law student Leonardo Jacobs. Later, the four students from Leiden worked with the cartoonist Wijo Koek. They got in touch with Maurice de Hond through Jacobs, and were commissioned to make a topography program. This program was included with the purchase of a Commodore 64 or ZX Spectrum from V&D or Dixons. While initially only released in the Netherlands, this program was later translated and published in Finland as well.

Some of Radarsoft's most successful games include the shooter Eindeloos (aka Endless or Infinitis, 1985, also released in France and England) and the platform game Hopeloos (Hopeless, 1986). The games Topografie Nederland and Tempo Typen were used in the television game show It's All in the Game. They also released a Commodore 64 platform game featuring Snoopy (1984) and Co & Co (1985). The last game Radarsoft has been credited for is Zenith (1997), a pinball game for the Philips CD-i.

Radarsoft now focuses on educational multimedia software and multimedia projects on CD-ROM, DVD and internet.

Titles
A selection of video games published by Radarsoft:

References

External links

Alphen aan den Rijn
Dutch companies established in 1984
Software companies of the Netherlands
Video game companies established in 1984
Video game companies of the Netherlands